Compassvale is a neighbourhood of Sengkang New Town, and is located between Rivervale and Anchorvale. Compassvale encompasses the Sengkang Town Centre.

History
There used to be a few low-rise flats along Punggol Road with a defunct road named Buangkok South Farmway 1 leading into the estate. It was part of a rural centre built by HDB in the late 1970s. These flats were cleared by mid-2000s for further developments in the vicinity.

Educational institutions
Primary schools
Compassvale Primary School
North Vista Primary School
Seng Kang Primary School

Secondary schools
Compassvale Secondary School
Seng Kang Secondary School

Places of worship

Buddhist temples
 Pu Ti Buddhist Temple
 Fu Hui Auditorium, also known as Singapore Buddhist Welfare Services

Mosque
 Mawaddah Mosque

Shopping amenities
Compass One Shopping Centre

Public transport
Compassvale is well served by many bus services originating from the Sengkang Bus Interchange, Compassvale Bus Interchange and from other parts of the island. Sengkang MRT station and the east loop of the Sengkang LRT line also serves the area, at Compassvale & Ranggung LRT stations. Buangkok MRT station serves residents living at the southern portion of the neighborhood.

Bus services that call at a pair of bus stops located along the TPE-Punggol Road Interchange also serves residents living in the vicinity, at the Sengkang-Punggol boundary.

Gallery
Housing estates

Educational institutions

Sengkang Sculpture Park

Sengkang town centre

 
Sengkang